The following is a list of mayors of Accra, Ghana.

 E.C. Quaye (1958–1962) 
 Benjamin N. O. Addison (1963 - ?)  
 G.W. Amarteifio (1970-1972) 
 S.J.A Mark Okai 
 A.K. Konuah 
 Nat Ashalley-Anthony (1979–1981)
 Triumvirate (Enoch T. Mensah, C.S. Botchway, Daniel Osabu-Kle) (1982–1983)
 Enoch Teye Mensah (1983–1991)
 Nat Nunoo Amarteifio (1994–1998)
 Samuel Adoquaye Addo (1998–2000)
 Solomon Ofei Darko (2001–2003)
 Stanley Nii Adjiri Blankson (2004–2009)
 Alfred Oko Vanderpuije (2009–2017)
 Mohammed Adjei Sowah (2017–present)
Accra